The secretary of state for Northern Ireland, also referred to as the Northern Ireland secretary or SoSNI, is a secretary of state in the Government of the United Kingdom, with overall responsibility for the Northern Ireland Office. The incumbent is a member of the Cabinet of the United Kingdom.

The office holder works alongside the other Northern Ireland Office ministers. The corresponding shadow minister is the Shadow Secretary of State for Northern Ireland.

History
Historically, the principal ministers for Irish (and subsequently Northern Ireland) affairs in the UK Government and its predecessors were:
 the Lord Lieutenant of Ireland (c.1171–1922);
 the Chief Secretary for Ireland (1560–1922); and
 the Home Secretary (1922–1972).

In August 1969, for example, Home Secretary James Callaghan approved the sending of British Army soldiers to Northern Ireland. Scotland and Wales were represented by the Secretary of State for Scotland and Secretary of State for Wales from 1885 and 1964 respectively, but Northern Ireland remained separate, owing to the devolved Government of Northern Ireland and Parliament of Northern Ireland.

The office of Secretary of State for Northern Ireland was created after the Northern Ireland government (at Stormont) was first suspended and then abolished following widespread civil strife. The British government was increasingly concerned that Stormont was losing control of the situation. On 30 March 1972, direct rule from Westminster was introduced. The Secretary of State filled three roles which existed under the previous Stormont regime:
 the Governor of Northern Ireland (the nominal head of the executive and representative of the British monarch)
 the Prime Minister of Northern Ireland (now filled by the First Minister of Northern Ireland and deputy First Minister of Northern Ireland acting jointly)
 the Minister of Home Affairs (now filled by the Minister of Justice).

Direct rule was seen as a temporary measure, with a power-sharing devolution preferred as the solution, and was annually renewed by a vote in Parliament.

The Sunningdale Agreement in 1973 resulted in the brief existence of a power-sharing Northern Ireland Executive from 1 January 1974, which was ended by the loyalist Ulster Workers' Council strike on 28 May 1974. The strikers opposed the power-sharing and all-Ireland aspects of the new administration.

The Northern Ireland Constitutional Convention (1975–1976) and Northern Ireland Assembly (1982–1986) were unsuccessful in restoring devolved government. After the Anglo-Irish Agreement on 15 November 1985, the UK Government and Irish Government co-operated more closely on security and political matters.

Following the Belfast Agreement (also known as the Good Friday Agreement) on 10 April 1998, devolution returned to Northern Ireland on 2 December 1999. This removed many of the duties of the Secretary of State and his Northern Ireland Office colleagues and devolved them to locally elected politicians, constituting the Northern Ireland Executive.

Formerly holding a large portfolio over home affairs in Northern Ireland, the current devolution settlement has lessened the secretary of state's role, granting many of the former powers to the Northern Ireland Assembly and Northern Ireland Executive. The secretary of state is now generally limited to representing Northern Ireland in the UK cabinet, overseeing the operation of the devolved administration and a number of reserved and excepted matters which remain the sole competence of the UK Government e.g. security, human rights, certain public inquiries and the administration of elections.

Created in 1972, the position has switched between members of Parliament from the Conservative Party and Labour Party. As Labour has not fielded candidates in Northern Ireland and the Conservatives have not had candidates elected to Northern Ireland Assembly or for House of Commons seats in the region, those appointed as secretary of state for Northern Ireland have not represented a constituency in Northern Ireland. This contrasts with the Secretary of State for Scotland and the Secretary of State for Wales.

The secretary of state officially resides in Hillsborough Castle, which was previously the official residence of the governor of Northern Ireland, and remains the royal residence of the monarch in Northern Ireland. The secretary of state exercises their duties through, and is administratively supported by, the Northern Ireland Office (NIO).

The devolved administration was suspended several times (especially between 15 October 2002 and 8 May 2007) because the Ulster Unionist Party and Democratic Unionist Party were uncomfortable being in government with Sinn Féin when the Provisional Irish Republican Army had failed to decommission its arms fully and continued its criminal activities. On each of these occasions, the responsibilities of the ministers in the Executive then returned to the Secretary of State and his ministers. During these periods, in addition to administration of the region, the Secretary of State was also heavily involved in the negotiations with all parties to restore devolved government.

Power was again devolved to the Northern Ireland Assembly on 8 May 2007. The Secretary of State retained responsibility for policing and justice until most of those powers were devolved on 12 April 2010. Robert Hazell has suggested merging the offices of Secretary of State for Northern Ireland, Scotland and Wales into one Secretary of State for the Union, in a department into which Rodney Brazier has suggested adding a Minister of State for England with responsibility for English local government.

List of secretaries of state for Northern Ireland 
Colour key

See also
 First Minister of Northern Ireland
 Great Seal of Northern Ireland
 Shadow Secretary of State for Northern Ireland
 Secretary of State (United Kingdom)
 Secretary of State for Scotland
 Secretary of State for Wales
 Chief Secretary for Ireland, office that existed until 1922
 Governor of Northern Ireland, office that existed from 1922 to 1973

Notes

Northern Ireland
Government of Northern Ireland
Ministerial offices in the United Kingdom
1972 establishments in the United Kingdom